Jeremy O. Harris (born ) is an American playwright, actor, and philanthropist, known for his plays "Daddy" and Slave Play. The latter received 12 nominations at the 74th Tony Awards, breaking the record previously set by the 2018 revival of Angels in America for most nominations for a non-musical play. Harris was the winner of the 2018 Paula Vogel Playwriting Award, given by the Vineyard Theatre in New York City. A profile in the New York Times said that Harris's "ability to render subconscious trauma into provocative theatrical expression, as potentially unsettling as entertaining, has earned him a lot of attention in a very short time." Out called him "the queer black savior the theater world needs."

Early life
Harris grew up in a military family, moving often before settling in Martinsville, Virginia. He has since lived in Chicago, Los Angeles, and New York. He attended the Carlisle School in Martinsville, Virginia. Harris studied toward a Bachelor of Fine Arts in acting from The Theatre School at DePaul University in 2009 but was cut from the program after a year. In 2019, he graduated with a Master of Fine Arts in playwriting from the Yale School of Drama.

Career 

Harris landed a role in the play Jon at the Steppenwolf Theatre Company. He worked as an actor in Chicago, then moved to Los Angeles to further his career. There he began a collaboration with musician Isabella Summers that resulted in the play Xander Xyst, Dragon 1; the play was produced at ANT Fest 2017 in New York. He had a residency at the MacDowell Colony, where he wrote the play "Daddy", in which a young black artist (Franklin) becomes involved with an older European art collector (Andre). "Daddy" served as Harris's writing sample when he applied to the Yale School of Drama, where he began studies in the fall of 2016.

While still at Yale, Harris wrote Slave Play. It was produced at Yale in October 2017, and won the Lorraine Hansberry Playwriting Award and the Rosa Parks Playwriting Award at the 2018 American College Theater Festival. It was then produced off-Broadway at the New York Theatre Workshop under the direction of Robert O'Hara in 2018, Harris's first professional production as playwright. The play addresses sexuality and racial trauma in America. It begins with interracial sexual violence on a slave plantation in the American South and continues in present-day America at a sex therapy retreat for interracial couples. The couples include black participants who are no longer able to receive pleasure from their white partners. The white partners have a blind-spot about the role that race plays in their relationships. Critic Jesse Green summarized the play's message, saying "that one race lives with history each day while another pretends not to". Though critically acclaimed, the play drew ire from those who found the play's content disrespectful of African-American history. For the 74th Tony Awards, Slave Play was nominated for a historic total of 12 awards.

In 2018, Harris was awarded the Paula Vogel Playwriting Award, which includes a residency at the off-Broadway Vineyard Theatre. In 2019, The New Group and the Vineyard Theatre co-produced a revised version of Harris's earlier play "Daddy". starring Alan Cumming. Reviewer Christian Lewis called the play "a bold, experimental, political, and important work of theater that will not soon be forgotten". New York Times reviewer Ben Brantley noted some excellent performances, but found the dialogue "endless and circular and repetitive" and the play too "cerebral".

In June 2019, to mark the 50th anniversary of the Stonewall riots, sparking the start of the modern LGBT rights movement, Queerty named Harris one of the Pride50 "trailblazing individuals who actively ensure society remains moving towards equality, acceptance and dignity for all queer people."

In November 2019, an experimental work entitled Black Exhibition, credited under the pseudonym @GaryXXXFisher, debuted at the Brooklyn theater Bushwick Starr. Using Ntozake Shange's term choreopoem to describe its structure, Harris combines language and movement in a work that centers on five characters: San Francisco writer Gary Fisher, Kathy Acker, Yukio Mishima, Samuel R. Delany, and Missouri college athlete Michael L. Johnson.

Harris is a co-author on the screenplay for the 2021 film Zola, directed by Janicza Bravo. The film follows a road trip that results in sex-trafficking, and is based on a real-life Twitter thread.

In early 2020, Harris signed a deal with HBO, and is developing a pilot as well as becoming a co-producer for season 2 of Euphoria, after consulting on the first season. More recently, he set $50,000 commissions for new stage work.

Harris published a condensed version of his play Yell: A Documentary of My Time Here in n+1 magazine's Fall 2020 issue. Harris describes the full play as "a site-specific document of [his] time in the space of Yale School of Drama".

Philanthropy 
, Harris has pledged and redistributed a significant portion of his earnings from collaborations with the fashion industry and an HBO deal to The New York Theatre Workshop, libraries across the United States, and microgrants to the Bushwick Starr theater in New York.

For the New York Theatre Workshop, Harris has created two $50,000 commissions for new works by Black women playwrights. He produced streaming for both "Heroes of the Fourth Turning" (a remount of an earlier digital reading) and "Circle Jerk" (later produced as a physical production by the same team) donated a collection of plays by Black writers to one library in each of the 50 states, plus Washington, D.C., Puerto Rico, and Guam, and pledged various fees and royalties from Slave Play to fund $500 microgrants, administered by the Bushwick Starr theater, to 152 U.S.-based playwrights.

In 2020, Harris has sent a letter to then-president-elect Joe Biden, urging him to revive the Federal Theatre Project, and then used an appearance on Late Night with Seth Meyers to further advocate the idea.

Personal life 
Harris is gay. Interviews frequently mention Harris's physical appearance, including his  stature, and what GQ called his "dandyish style".

List of works

Stage 
Xander Xyst, Dragon 1 (2017)
Slave Play (2018)
"Daddy": A Melodrama (2016, revised 2019)
Water Sports; or, Insignificant White Boys (2019)
Black Exhibition (2019)
Yell: A Documentary of My Time Here (revised 2020)
A Boy’s Company Presents: 'Tell Me If I'm Hurting You''' (2021)

 TV and film 

 Zola (2021), co-writer with Janicza Bravo
 Emily in Paris (2022)

Awards
 Paula Vogel Playwriting Award, 2018
 Lotos Foundation Prize, 2018
 Rosa Parks Playwriting Award, 2018
 Lorraine Hansberry Playwriting Award, 2018

|-
! scope="row" | 2020
| Slave Play''
| Tony Award for Best Play
|

See also
LGBT culture in New York City
List of LGBT people from New York City
Hari Nef
John Golden Theatre
Isabella Summers
Nimrod Kamer

References

Further reading

External links
 

1980s births
Living people
20th-century African-American people
21st-century African-American writers
21st-century American dramatists and playwrights
21st-century American male writers
21st-century American screenwriters
African-American dramatists and playwrights
African-American male writers
American gay writers
DePaul University alumni
LGBT African Americans
American LGBT dramatists and playwrights
LGBT people from Virginia
People from Martinsville, Virginia
Yale School of Drama alumni